Pain Kola Mahalleh (also Romanized as Pā’īn Kolā Maḩalleh) is a village in Machian Rural District, Kelachay District, Rudsar County, Gilan Province, Iran. At the 2006 census, its population was 72, in 20 families.

References 

Populated places in Rudsar County